Adil Hossain Noble(born 20  December) is a Bangladeshi Performer and model. He was born in Chittagong city. Apart from modelling he has acted in several TV dramas. He was the judge of the Veet Channel I Female Model Hunt event. He works as the Chief Enterprise Business Officer of Robi Axiata Limited. Noble has won success by acting in many plays in his career. Among them are 'Kusum Kanta, 'Choto Choto Dheu', 'Tahara', 'Prema Tomake, 'Shesher Kobitar Porer Kobita', 'Brishti Pore', 'Nissonggo Radhachura', 'Tumi Amake Boloni', 'House Husband, Sobuj Alpothe'. He received several significant rewards for his work including Meril Favorite Star award -1997 (Best Model), Meril Prothom Alo Star award - 1998, 2000, 2001, 2003, 2004 (Best Model), Meril Prothom Alo Star award - 1999 (Top Model).

Early life
Noble was born and raised in Chakaria, Chittagong. After graduation from Chittagong College in 1989, he moved to Dhaka. He completed his MBA from Victoria University. He has also undergone higher training in Key Accounts Management from Singapore Institute of Management, Indian Institute of Management and Xavier Labour Relations Institute. Since he had done some modeling as a student, he was introduced to the modeling industry by Afzal Hossain.  He first worked in an ad for Sprite. That ad was not aired due to technical reasons. Azad Ballpen's 'Lonely Day, Lonely Night' ad directed by Afzal Hossain is the first widely viewed advertisement for the Noble.

Career
Noble started his career through fashion shows in 1991. Some of his TV commercials are Sprite, HRC Tea, Azad Ballpoint Pen, RC Cola, Pakiza Saree, Keya Beauty Soap, Keya Lip Gel, and Asian Paint. The pair of Noble and Mou became popular in TV modelling. 'Prachir Periye''' was his first TV drama.

Noble acted in some TV dramas apart from his modeling. His first drama was Prachir Periye'' which was the first package TV drama in the country. The drama was telecasted on BTV in 1995. He also played the character of Kazi Anwar Hossain's popular secret agent Masud Rana for television.

Professionally, Noble started his career in the Shipping Division of MGH Group in December 1993. In July 1996, he joined a manufacturing company Coats Bangladesh Ltd. He was General Manager of Marketing Services in COATS Bangladesh Ltd. In 2010, he joined Warid Telecom Limited (now Airtel Bangladesh) as Head Corporate and SME Sales in the Sales Division. Adil was appointed as the Chief Enterprise Business Officer on June 1, 2019. He joined Robi in October 2014 as Executive Vice President, Enterprise Business.

Noble is one of the judges of female model hunt contest Veet Channel I Top Model, and guest judge of Lux Channel i Superstar on Channel i.

Filmography

Drama

Brand Ambassador 

 Brand Ambassador of LUBNAN. Year: 2011, 2012, 2013
 Brand Ambassador of Richman. Year: 2014, 2015, 2016
 Brand Ambassador of Infinity Mega Mall. Year: 2017, 2018, 2019, 2020, 2021
 Brand Ambassador of Reckkit Benckiser HARPIC Brand. Year: 2016- 2017

Notable TVC 

 Azad Ball Pen- 1992
 Pakiza Saree- 1994
 HRC Tea- 1993
 Keya beauty soap- 1996, 1998
 Keya Telkom Powder- 1998, 2000
 Keya Lemon Soap- 1999, 2000
 Keya Detergent soap- 1998
 Keya Hair Oil- 2001
 Keya Toothpaste- 2002
 Keya Petroleum Jelly- 2003
 Keya Lifeguard Soap- 2012
 Amin Jewelers- 2004
 RC Cola- 2000, 2003, 2008, 2013
 RC Lemon-2012
 Banglalink telecom - 2008
 Soybean Oil-2015
 HARPIC Toilet Cleaner- 2016
 Danish Cookies- 2014
 ROBI TVC - 2017
 Infinity Mega Mall- 2019
 Chef Sunflower Oil - 2019
 Gree AC- 2019, 2020, 2021
 Godrej Expert Hair Color- 2021

As a Judge 

 Lux Channel I Super Star Award 2010
 Lux Channel I Super Star Award 2014
 Veet Channel I Top Model Hunt-2011, 2014, 2015

Awards
Noble got six awards for modeling. He was awarded Meril Prothom Alo Awards for Best Male Model category in 2003.

References

External links 

 

Living people
People from Chittagong
Bangladeshi male television actors
Bangladeshi male models
Place of birth missing (living people)
Year of birth missing (living people)